The following highways are numbered 950:

Canada

United States